Alejandro "Álex" Maclean (6 August 1969 – 17 August 2010) was a Spanish TV film producer and aerobatics pilot, who competed in the Red Bull Air Race World Championship under the number 36. Maclean was nicknamed "The Flying Matador".

Maclean, whose grandfather was Scottish and hence his family name, was fascinated by airplanes as a child. So, he built and collected model airplanes, and later stepped up to remote controlled planes. At the age of 18, he bought his own Ultralight. Soon, he began to try out some basic manoeuvres in his new plane. The aerobatics resulted in his first accident. Maclean later experienced two more serious air accidents during aerobatics flights.

In 2005 Maclean became captain of the Spanish aerobatics team.

He had a partnership in a TV film production company, enjoyed skydiving, flying helicopters, horse-riding and waterskiing. Maclean was married to Emma. The couple has two sons Alejandro and Eduardo.

He died on 17 August 2010, when his plane crashed into the ground, while performing a manoeuvre during a training exercise in Casarrubios del Monte, Spain.

Achievements
 European champion in unlimited aerobatics
 The winner of 1998 Lithuanian Open Aerobatic Championship
 Two-time Spanish aerobatics champion

Legend:
 CAN: Cancelled
 DNP: Did not participate
 DNS: Did not show
 DQ: Disqualified
 NC: Not classified
 TP:Technical Problems

See also

 Competition aerobatics

References

External links

 Red Bull Air Race World Championship official website

1969 births
2010 deaths
Aerobatic pilots
Aviators killed in aviation accidents or incidents in Spain
Red Bull Air Race World Championship pilots
Spanish air racers
Spanish people of Scottish descent
Sport deaths in Spain
Sportspeople from Madrid
Victims of aviation accidents or incidents in 2010